New Baltimore Historic District is a national historic district located at New Baltimore, Fauquier County, Virginia.  It encompasses 55 contributing buildings and 1 contributing structure in the rural village of New Baltimore.  The majority of buildings in the district are dwellings, ranging in date from the 1820s to the mid-20th centuries.  Notable buildings include the Federal style James Hampton's Tavern (c. 1823), Eastview (c. 1830), and the New Baltimore School (1915).  The contributing structure is a one-lane bridge (c. 1920, 1937).

It was listed on the National Register of Historic Places in 2004.

References

Historic districts in Fauquier County, Virginia
Federal architecture in Virginia
Neoclassical architecture in Virginia
National Register of Historic Places in Fauquier County, Virginia
Historic districts on the National Register of Historic Places in Virginia